The 2014–15 UAB Blazers women's basketball team represents the University of Alabama at Birmingham during the 2014–15 NCAA Division I women's basketball season. The Blazers, led by second year head coach Randy Norton, play their home games at the Bartow Arena and were members of Conference USA. They finished the season 18–13, 11–7 in C-USA play to finish in a three way tie for fourth place. They advanced to the quarterfinals of the C-USA women's tournament where they lost to Southern Miss. Despite with 18 wins, they were not invited to a postseason tournament.

Roster

Schedule

|-
!colspan=9 style="background:#006600; color:#CFB53B;"| Exhibition

|-
!colspan=9 style="background:#006600; color:#CFB53B;"| Regular season

|-
!colspan=9 style="background:#006600; color:#CFB53B;"| Conference USA Tournament

See also
2014–15 UAB Blazers men's basketball team

References

UAB Blazers women's basketball seasons
UAB